Eupatilin (5,7-Dihydroxy-3',4',6-trimethoxyflavone) is an O-methylated flavone, a type of flavonoids. It can be found in Artemisia asiatica (Asteraceae).

References 

O-methylated flavones
Flavonoids found in Asteraceae
Drugs acting on the gastrointestinal system and metabolism